Sir Charles Brune Graves-Sawle, 2nd Baronet (10 October 1816 – 20 April 1903) was a baronet and a member of the British House of Commons representing Bodmin.

He was the son of Joseph Sawle Graves-Sawle who had been created Baronet Graves-Sawle of Penrice in 1836. Graves-Sawle was MP for Bodmin from 1852 to 1857. He inherited the baronetcy on the death of his father in 1865. Sawle was also a Justice of the Peace, Special Deputy Warden of the Stannaries and Honorary Lieutenant Colonel of the Royal Cornwall and Devon Miners' Militia.

In 1846 Graves-Sawle married Rose Paynter (1818–1914), the friend and inspiration of the poet Walter Savage Landor. He wrote many poems dedicated to her. The Graves-Sawles lived in Penrice, near St Austell, Cornwall, and at 39 Eaton Place, St George Hanover Square, London. Their sons Francis (1849–1903), a captain in the Coldstream Guards, and Charles (1851–1932) who became a rear-admiral, both successively succeeded to the baronetcy. The couple had two daughters, Rose Dorothea (1847–1901) and Constance (1859–1942).

References

External links
 The Sawle family of Penrice

1816 births
1903 deaths
UK MPs 1852–1857
Baronets in the Baronetage of the United Kingdom
Members of the Parliament of the United Kingdom for Bodmin
High Sheriffs of Cornwall
English justices of the peace